Bebasi is a 2021 Pakistani television series co-produced by Momina Duraid and Noreen Ali under banners MD Productions and ProMax Media, written by Aliya Bukhari and directed by Barkat Siddiqui. It features Ali Rehman Khan and Alizeh Shah in lead roles along with Anoushey Abbasi, Nausheen Shah, Khushhal Khan and Shagufta Ejaz in supporting cast.

Cast 
 Alizeh Shah as Ifrah
 Ali Rehman Khan as Ahmar
 Khushhal Khan as Sahir
 Anoushey Abbasi as Nadia
 Nausheen Shah as Mahrukh
 Hina Rizvi as Azra, Ifrah's mother
 Farhan Ally Agha as Sajid, Ifrah's father
 Ismat Zaidi as Ifrah's grandmother
 Jawed Sheikh as Sahir's father
 Salma Asim as Sahir's mother
 Waseem Abbas as Tameezuddin
 Shagufta Ejaz as Ishrat Jahan 
 Eshal Fayyaz as Naila "Neeli"
 Seemi Pasha

Production 
In August 2021, director Barkat Siddiqui shared the details of his upcoming project with revealing the cast. During the production of the serial, the title Lekin was used as a working title.

References 

Pakistani drama television series
2021 Pakistani television series debuts
Hum TV original programming